The 1938 Purdue Boilermakers football team was an American football team that represented Purdue University during the 1938 Big Ten Conference football season.  In their second season under head coach Allen Elward, the Boilermakers compiled a 5–1–2 record, finished in a tie for second place in the Big Ten Conference with a 3–1–1 record against conference opponents, and outscored opponents by a total of 84 to 38.

Schedule

References

Purdue
Purdue Boilermakers football seasons
Purdue Boilermakers football